KMVQ-FM (99.7 MHz) is a radio station licensed to San Francisco, California. The station currently broadcasts a Top 40/CHR format branded as 99.7 Now. KMVQ's studios are at 2001 Junipero Serra Boulevard in Daly City, while its transmitter is located on San Bruno Mountain.

KMVQ-FM is owned by Salt Lake City–based Bonneville International. KMVQ directly competes with crosstown Top 40 KYLD. Other competing stations include heritage Urban KMEL and Rhythmic AC KRBQ.

KMVQ broadcasts in the HD Radio format.

History

The 99.7 FM frequency was originally owned by NBC, with sister station KNBR. The station signed on the air on October 12, 1949, as KNBC-FM. At various times, it aired a middle of the road format as KNBR-FM and an all-news format as KNAI-FM.

The KNBR-FM call letters returned to the market in 2019, this time on 104.5, the former KFOG.

KYUU
In 1978, NBC decided to take advantage of the newfound success of FM radio, so programmers were hired to create a new format, similar to Top 40 but targeting a market they felt was underserved, adults in the 25-34 age range. Years later, this approach would be labeled as "Hot adult contemporary." The station became KYUU.

Over time, the station migrated to more of a Top 40 format as "The Hit Music Station". By 1986, with KMEL dominating as the Bay Area's Top 40 station, the station migrated back to its Hot AC direction. During much of this time, KYUU's morning host was Don Bleu.

X-100
In 1988, NBC decided to sell all its owned-and-operated radio stations and concentrate on television. KYUU was among the last to be sold when Emmis Communications bought the radio station. Emmis made many changes, and due to heavy competition, in October 1988, decided to relaunch the station as X-100 and changed the call letters to KXXX. It had a dance-leaning CHR approach, mixing Top 40 hits with dance music. Notable personalities included George McFly, Chuck Geiger, Super Snake, Rex McNeil and morning hosts Bill Kelly & Al Kline.

X-100 fared poorly, unable to topple KMEL in the ratings, compared to the legacy of KYUU. This led Emmis to sell the station to real estate developer Peter Bedford under his "Coast Broadcasting" division. X-100 flipped to oldies as KFRC-FM on March 18, 1991. The following month, Bedford would buy 610 AM from RKO General, completing the sell-off of RKO's radio division. In January 1993, Alliance Broadcasting, a company run by former KYUU general manager John Hayes, would buy KFRC. On August 12, 1993, KFRC-FM began simulcasting on 610 AM.

Oldies 99.7 KFRC

This was not KFRC's first attempt at FM broadcasting. For many years, KFRC owned an FM counterpart at 106.1 FM, which carried a variety of formats. In 1977, KFRC's owners sold off the money-losing FM station at 106.1 (which soon became successful AOR station KMEL). Over the next few years, as the FM band eclipsed AM in popularity, it became clear that the owners had made a mistake. This was finally remedied in 1991 under different ownership with the purchase of KXXX.

As KFRC, 99.7 FM simulcast the oldies format of its well-known sister AM station. The oldies format proved very successful in the Bay Area market, reaching number one with the 25-54 year old demographic. In September 1995, Alliance would be bought out by Infinity Broadcasting.

In 2005, Infinity Broadcasting (later becoming CBS Radio) traded 610 AM to Christian radio broadcaster Family Stations, the owners of KEAR, for their station at 106.9 FM. On April 29, 2005, Family Stations began simulcasting the signal of their FM station on 610 AM, and the oldies format and KFRC call letters remained at 99.7 FM.

On September 5, 2005, KFRC relaunched its oldies format, this time focusing on 1970s & 1980s music with a low-key approach. The station billed itself as "the Bay Area's Classic Hits."

MOViN' 99.7

At 10:03 a.m. on September 22, 2006, after playing "American Pie" by Don McLean, KFRC switched to a Rhythmic AC format, relaunching this time as "The New Movin' 99.7" (with KFRC calls) with "Gonna Make You Sweat" by C+C Music Factory as the first song. The Movin' brand had previously been picked up by KQMV/Seattle, KMVN/Los Angeles, KYMV/Salt Lake City, KMVK/Dallas and WMVN/St. Louis.
The format switch was met with sharp criticism from long time listeners of the oldies format because it was the last remaining oldies station in the region.

On May 17, 2007, CBS Radio decided to bring back the old KFRC, as they dropped the "Free FM" talk format on 106.9 FM and revived the old "classic hits" format. The KFRC call sign moved to 106.9 FM. As a result, 99.7 FM received the new call sign KMVQ.  (KFRC-FM is now an All-news radio station, simulcasting KCBS 740.)

Transition to CHR
During the late summer and early fall of 2008, KMVQ evolved towards a Rhythmic-leaning Top 40 format with occasional classic rhythmic songs carried over from the previous format, becoming the first mainstream top 40 station for San Francisco in six years since KZQZ flipped to country in 2002. As a result, KMVQ became musically similar to CBS Radio's other newly launched top 40 stations in Houston, Los Angeles, New York City and Detroit. To fill the void, Clear Channel's KISQ shifted from urban AC to rhythmic AC.

In early 2009, KMVQ added many former DJ's from KYLD, including St. John and Strawberry to its weekday lineup. Later that year, on November 12, KMVQ added Fernando and Greg in the Morning as the station's new morning show, replacing Baltazar and Maria. The pair are the first openly gay duo to host a morning broadcast on American commercial radio. Before moving to KMVQ, the show was initially established on KNGY.

99.7 NOW
In mid-2010, KMVQ changed its logo to match the "AMP Radio" stations in Los Angeles (KAMP-FM) and Detroit (WDZH). The station began using the slogan "All The Hits!" On December 31, 2010, the station re-branded as "99-7 Now" to match the CBS owned WNOW-FM (92-3 Now) in New York City.

On February 2, 2017, CBS Radio announced that it would merge with Entercom. To comply with FCC ownership limits, it was announced that KMVQ, Entercom's KBLX, KOIT, and KUFX, and a cluster in Sacramento, would be divested. Under a local marketing agreement, Bonneville assumed operations of the stations following the completion of the merger on November 17. On August 3, 2018, Bonneville announced that it would acquire all of the divested Entercom stations it had been operating for $141 million; the sale was completed on September 21, 2018.

In 2020, KMVQ, along with the other Bonneville stations, moved their studios from the SoMa district in San Francisco into a newly built studio along Junipero Serra Boulevard in Daly City.

FM booster
KMVQ is rebroadcast on the following FM booster:

HD Radio
KMVQ-FM HD1 airs the same programming as the analog frequency. KMVQ-FM HD2 features a Dance format, billed as "Pulse Radio." The move came about after KNGY dropped its Dance format for Top 40/CHR in September 2009. The station became a full-time reporter on Billboard's Dance/Mix Show Airplay reporting panel in May 2019.

References

The Unplugged 99.7 KYUU Radio Archive
KFRC switches from oldies to music of 1970s and '80s, from the San Francisco Chronicle
The History of KFRC Radio

External links
FCC History Cards for KMVQ
 

 

MVQ-FM
Mass media in Oakland, California
Radio stations established in 1949
Contemporary hit radio stations in the United States
NBC Radio Network affiliates
1949 establishments in California
Bonneville International